Carregado is a former civil parish, located in the municipality of Alenquer, in western Portugal. In 2013, the parish merged into the new parish Carregado e Cadafais. It has a population of 9,066 inhabitants and a total area of 15.52 km². The town is a north-east exurb of Lisbon.

The railway between Carregado and Lisbon was the first line to be built in Portugal; it opened in 1856.

See also
History of rail transport in Portugal

References

Former parishes of Alenquer, Portugal